These Are My Favourites is the fourth and final studio album released by English TV personality, Bruce Forsyth. The album was released on November 7, 2011, through EMI Records. It peaked at number 58 on the UK Albums Chart.

Track listing

Chart performance

Release history

References

2011 albums